is a Japanese nawashi and adult video (AV) director.

Life and career

Randa Mai was born on 25 March 1959 and has been working as a professional nawashi for many years. With his alias translated roughly as "wild dancer", he is known for AVs with bondage themes, such as the  series for Attackers, as well as instructional videos on Japanese bondage.

Randa Mai describes himself as an "S&M entertainer" rather than a nawashi. He has also performed outside Japan, including Europe and United States, and runs  in Roppongi. As a martial artist he is versed in Shorinji Kempo.

References

External links
Mai Randa official website

Living people
1959 births
Bondage riggers
Japanese pornographic film directors
Japanese male karateka